The Honey Bee is a 1920 American silent drama film directed by Rupert Julian and starring Marguerita Sylva, Thomas Holding and Nigel Barrie.

Cast
 Marguerita Sylva as Hilda Wilson 
 Thomas Holding as Harris Doreyn 
 Nigel Barrie as Blink Moran 
 Albert Ray as Will Harper 
 George Hernandez as Ed Johnson 
 Harvey Clark as Dr. Jules Garceau 
 Dell Boone as Mrs. Harris Doreyn 
 Ethel Ullman as Adele Rainey 
 Charlotte Merriam as Blondie 
 Ruth Maurice as Juliette 
 Harry Tenbrook as Apache 
 Norman Selby as Carpentier

References

Bibliography
 Goble, Alan. The Complete Index to Literary Sources in Film. Walter de Gruyter, 1999.

External links

1920 films
1920 drama films
Silent American drama films
Films directed by Rupert Julian
American silent feature films
1920s English-language films
Pathé Exchange films
American black-and-white films
1920s American films